Chen Qiqiu (born January 4, 1978, in Meizhou, Guangdong, China) is a former male badminton player from the People's Republic of China. He is now a doubles coach for the Chinese national team.

Career
A doubles specialist who has paired with a variety of partners, Chen won men's doubles at the Thailand Open in 1999 and the Malaysia Open in 2002. He won mixed doubles at the Polish (2000), Thailand (2003), and Denmark (2004) Opens. He was also a runner-up in mixed doubles at the prestigious All-England Championships in 2003 with Zhao Tingting, the partner with whom he had his greatest success. They were bronze medalists at the 2003 IBF World Championships and quarterfinalists at the 2004 Olympic Games in Athens.

Achievements

IBF World Grand Prix 
The World Badminton Grand Prix sanctioned by International Badminton Federation (IBF) from 1983 to 2006.

Men's doubles

References

External links
 Profile at InternationalBadminton.org
 
 
 
 
 

1978 births
Living people
Badminton players at the 2000 Summer Olympics
Badminton players at the 2004 Summer Olympics
Badminton players from Guangdong
Olympic badminton players of China
Sportspeople from Meizhou
Asian Games medalists in badminton
Hakka sportspeople
Badminton players at the 2002 Asian Games
Chinese male badminton players
Asian Games bronze medalists for China
Medalists at the 2002 Asian Games
20th-century Chinese people
21st-century Chinese people